Prisoe Cove (‘Zaliv Prisoe’ \'za-liv pri-'so-e\) is the 3.7 km wide cove indenting for 1.75 km the north coast of Livingston Island in the South Shetland Islands, Antarctica.  Entered between Agüero Point and Avitohol Point.  Most of the cove's coastline is formed by the termini of Berkovitsa Glacier and Medven Glacier separated by Remetalk Point.

The cove is named after the settlement of Prisoeto in northern Bulgaria.

Location
British mapping in 1968, Spanish in 1991, and Bulgarian in 2005 and 2009.

Map
 L.L. Ivanov. Antarctica: Livingston Island and Greenwich, Robert, Snow and Smith Islands. Scale 1:120000 topographic map.  Troyan: Manfred Wörner Foundation, 2009.  
 Antarctic Digital Database (ADD). Scale 1:250000 topographic map of Antarctica. Scientific Committee on Antarctic Research (SCAR). Since 1993, regularly upgraded and updated.
 L.L. Ivanov. Antarctica: Livingston Island and Smith Island. Scale 1:100000 topographic map. Manfred Wörner Foundation, 2017.

References
 Bulgarian Antarctic Gazetteer. Antarctic Place-names Commission. (details in Bulgarian, basic data in English)
 Prisoe Cove. SCAR Composite Antarctic Gazetteer

External links
 Prisoe Cove. Copernix satellite image

Coves of Livingston Island
Bulgaria and the Antarctic